Capitalk 100.4 FM is a commercial  talk radio station based in and broadcasts from Harare, Zimbabwe.

It is Zimbabwe's first commercial talk radio station. It broadcasts in the country's capital, focusing mainly on issues affecting the community of Harare and surroundings.

The station became the first in the country to host a live radio interview with the country's president, Emmerson Mnangagwa where the listeners got a chance to interact and  ask questions to the president through phone calls, social media and text messages.

References

External links

Radio stations in Zimbabwe
News and talk radio stations
Mass media in Harare
2016 establishments in Zimbabwe
Radio stations established in 2016